The Berlin Victory Parade of 1945 was held by the Allies of World War II on 7 September 1945 in Berlin, the capital of the defeated Nazi Germany, shortly after the end of World War II. The four participating countries were the Soviet Union, the United States, the United Kingdom, and France.

The parade was proposed by the Soviet Union, following the June Moscow Victory Parade of 1945. July in Berlin also saw a British parade (the 1945 British Berlin Victory Parade).

Senior officers present at the parade were Marshal of the Soviet Union Georgy Zhukov from the USSR, General George S. Patton from the United States, General Brian Robertson, from the United Kingdom, and General Marie-Pierre Kœnig from France. General Dwight D. Eisenhower and Field Marshal Bernard Montgomery declined the invitations shortly before the parade, and sent Patton and Robertson as their representatives. Units present included the Soviet 248th Infantry Division, the French 2nd Infantry Division, the British 131st Infantry Brigade, and the U.S. 82nd Airborne Division; the forces present came primarily from the local garrisons. The armoured contingent came from the British 7th Armoured Division, French 1st Armored Division, and U.S. 16th Mechanized Cavalry Group. The Red Army used this occasion for the first public display of the IS-3 heavy tank, with 52 tanks from the 2nd Guards Tank Army participating.

Russian sources refer to this parade as a "forgotten parade", as it was mentioned in only a few Western sources. The forces of four Allies also participated in another Berlin parade several months later, on the Charlottenburger Chaussee, in front of the Brandenburg Gate, on the first anniversary of the German surrender on 8 May 1946, in the Berlin Victory Parade of 1946. This parade was connected to the inauguration of the Soviet War Memorial at Tiergarten. Soviet troops would not be present at the much more widely known in the West London Victory Celebrations of 1946.

See also
 Moscow Victory Parade of 1945
 London Victory Celebrations of 1946
 New York City Victory Parade of 1946

References

External links
Berlin Victory Parade Newsreels // Net-Film Newsreels and Documentary Films Archive
Allied Troops Parade September 7th, 1945 (silent film)
 Video Забытый парад ("Forgotten Parade")

Aftermath of World War II in Germany
1945 in Germany
Victory parades
Parades in Germany
Soviet Union–United States relations
Soviet Union–United Kingdom relations
France–Soviet Union relations
1945 in military history
1940s in Berlin
Cold War
September 1945 events in Europe
Military parades in Germany